A list of films produced in South Korea in 1962:

External links
1962 in South Korea

 1960-1969 at koreanfilm.org

South Korea
1962
Films